The Anglican Diocese of Offa is one of eight within the Anglican Province of Kwara, itself one of 14 provinces within the Church of Nigeria. The last bishop was Akintunde Popoola; and the incumbent is Solomon Olusola Akanbi.

Notes

Church of Nigeria dioceses
Dioceses of the Province of Kwara